Greya pectinifera is a moth of the family Prodoxidae. It is found in moist coniferous forests on the Olympic Peninsula and in the Mount Rainier region of the Cascades in Washington.

The larvae possibly feed on Saxifraga species.

References

Moths described in 1992
Prodoxidae
Taxa named by Donald R. Davis (entomologist)